Horrocks Barracks was a military installation in Schloss Neuhaus, Germany.

Description

Horrocks Barracks was located in the grounds of Schloss Neuhaus, about four kilometres from the Paderborn city centre, and covered approximately 30 acres (12 hectares) of land. The barracks was bordered by the rivers Pader, Lippe and Alme ("Castle Island") and the Residenzstrasse.

History

1247 – 1802: Beginnings and Palace of the Prince Bishops of Paderborn

Construction of the castle began in 1257 under bishop Simon I. zur Lippe (1247–1277).
Around 1370 and after numerous attacks bishop Heinrich von Spiegel (1361–1380) built the still existing part of the castle ("Haus Spiegel") and made it the constant palace of the prince bishops of Paderborn. Extensions are:
"Haus Braunschweig" (1524–1526)
"Haus Köln" (1534) which connected the first two buildings.
"Haus Kerssenbrock" (1548–1560)
"Haus Fürstenberg" and the four towers (1590–1597)

In 1736 the garden next to the castle was completed. It is now part of the Garden Heritage Network - EGHN.

Additional historic buildings around the castle from that period are:
"Marstall" (Stables, 1729–1732/1733)
"Schlosswache" (Guard House, 1733)

1802 – 1945: Prussian Use (Schloss-Kaserne)

The Kingdom of Prussia officially annexed the whole site August 3, 1802.

Before being used as a military installation the castle served as a cloth factory with 120 to 130 employees (1806-1819, Zurhelle & Delhas, from Lippstadt) and a prison (1810-1814).

The "Schloss-Kaserne" was then home to 
4th (Westphalian) Cuirassiers "von Driesen" (October 6, 1820–August 17, 1833)
Thüringisches Ulanen-Regiment Nr. 6 (September 1833–March 17, 1848, and October 28, 1848-May 16, 1849)
Landwehr-Regiment Berlin (1849-1849)
3rd Hussars (October 13, 1849–1851)
11th Hussar Regiment (Prussia) (December 22, 1850-1851)
the Prussian 8th Hussars (February 24, 1851–1919)
Reiter-Regiment Nr. 15 (1921–1945)

The following buildings date back to the Prussian use of the site
"Kleine Reithalle" (1824, now the "Städtische Gallerie in der Reithalle")
"Lange Stall" (1824, Garrison Stables during British use, demolished 1984)
"Kompaniegebäude" (1876–1878, HQ 12 PLSU RPC, demolished 1992)
"Reithalle mit Stallungen" (1876–1878, NAAFI Shop, now the "Schlosshalle")
"Waschhaus"/"Alte Kommandantur" (1883/1884, HQ 211 MCAG RE, now the offices of the Schloss- and Auenpark)
"Block 20" (1935/1936, 420 MCLG RPC, now part of GSN Gymnasium Schloss Neuhaus)
various buildings used as quarters, stables, stores and garages (NAAFI Bulk Issue Store, demolished in the early 1980s)

1945 – 1992: British Use (Horrocks Barracks)

The site was captured by troops of the U.S. 9th Army April 3, 1945, at 18.00, during the battle of the Ruhr Pocket.
The Battle of the Ruhr Pocket involved the British Second Army, part of the 21st Army Group.
These two formations took over command at Neuhaus May 5, 1945, and became British Army of the Rhine August 25, 1945.

For use by the British Army, the barracks was named after Lieutenant-General Sir Brian Horrocks. The allocated British Forces Post Office number was 16. Over the years it was home to several units. Among them are:
368 Works Gp RE (Royal Engineers)
1st Battalion Royal Norfolk Regiment, 1946-1947
211 MCAG RE (Royal Engineers, June 1947–1992)
420 MCLG RPC (Royal Pioneer Corps)
HQ 12 PLSU RPC with CWG Wing (Royal Pioneer Corps), 1947-1992
NAAFI Shop and NAAFI Bulk Issue Store
Garrison Stables (until demolished in the early 1980s; the Equestrian Centre then moved to Athlone Barracks) used by various units of Paderborn Garrison. Among them:
17th/21st Lancers (1962-1968)

1957 marked the 700th anniversary of the castle and Her Majesty Queen Elizabeth II gifted the community a pair of Thames swans, handed over by Major J L Jordan, OC 211 MCAG RE BAOR, in June 1957.

In 1959 the British Forces handed back the Schloss itself to the Federal Republic of Germany. It was then purchased by the City of Paderborn June 25, 1964. and it was officially handed over to the community July 19, 1964.

The NAAFI shop at Schloss Neuhaus was in the spotlight November 28, 1981, when a 2-year-old child, Katrice Lee, went missing during a shopping expedition with her family.

Horrocks Barracks closed, after 47 years, July 20, 1992.

1992 – present: Landesgartenschau 1994

The whole Schloss-area was handed back to the German authorities in 1992 to create what was the "Landesgartenschau 1994". 211 MCAG RE undertook the construction of six twin city partnership gardens as a Military Aid to the Civil Community (MACC) task.
The former NAAFI-shop-building was first known as the "Bürgerhaus" and nowadays as the "Schlosshalle".

References 

British Army barracks in Germany
Installations of the British Army